Lin Huiyin (known as Phyllis Lin or Lin Whei-yin when in the United States; 10 June 1904 – 1 April 1955) was a Chinese architect and writer. She is known to be the first female architect in modern China and her husband the famed "Father of Modern Chinese Architecture" Liang Sicheng, both of whom worked as founders and faculty in the newly formed Architecture Department of Northeastern University in 1928 and, after 1949, as professors in Tsinghua University in Beijing. Liang and Lin began restoration work on cultural heritage sites of China in the post-imperial Republican Era of China; a passion which she would pursue to the end of her life. The American artist Maya Lin is her niece.

Biography

Lin was born in Hangzhou though her family was from Minhou. She was the daughter of Lin Changmin (林長民) (16 September 1876 - Minhou, 24 December 1925) and He Xueyuan (何雪媛) (1882–1972).

In a time when women had limited access to formal education, Lin was able to receive a formal education due to being part of a wealthy family. Because of her family's affluence she was able to travel extensively with her father. She obtained her degrees both in England and the United States. It was there she became acquainted with the well known Chinese poet Xu Zhimo. Their relationship was a sensational part of Lin Huiyin's life and is referred to in romantic anecdotes. However, Lin's works are highly regarded. Lin wrote free verse, novels and prose. Lin's poems appeared in publications such as the Beijing Morning Post, Crescent Monthly, Poetry and the Dipper and the newspaper L'impartiale in Tianjin.

In 1924, Lin and Liang Sicheng both enrolled at the University of Pennsylvania, where she also worked as a part-time assistant in the architectural department. Although they both wanted to attend the School of Architecture, Lin was not admitted because she was a woman. She therefore enrolled in the School of Fine Arts. Later, she enrolled in stage design programs in Yale University as a graduate student, pursuing her longtime interest in drama.

During her studies she pursued her passion for architecture by taking architectural classes. It was here that Lin along with Liang Sicheng, her future husband whom she had known since childhood, pursued their love of architecture.

In April 1924, the sixty-four-year old Indian poet Tagore visited China, Lin Huiyin and Xu Zhimo worked together to do the interpretation work for Tagore, during which Lin Huiyin distinguished herself with her fluent English and also won the admiration of the poet.

Career
In the wake of the September 18th Incident, Lin left for Beijing, where she studied ancient Chinese architecture. Upon her return, she helped to establish the Architectural Department at Northeastern University in Shenyang, where she then taught architecture briefly. Meanwhile, in 1928, she designed a railway station in Jilin. This was one of the few buildings Lin designed. Throughout the 1930s, Lin and her husband lived in Beiping, as Beijing was then called, near both of their families. Close friends at the time were the Americans Wilma and John K. Fairbank, who admired her sense of living on a “kind of double cultural frontier,” and facing the problem of “the necessity to winnow the past and discriminate among things foreign, what to preserve and what to borrow.” He recalled the joy she took when she and her husband  climbed the roof of the Temple of Heaven, which made her the first woman to attempt the walk on the emperor's palace roof and when in 1937, she discovered the main hall of Foguang Temple near Doucun, Shanxi. The hall was the only remaining Tang dynasty timber structure known at the time.

As Japan's invasion loomed, Lin Huiyin and her husband had to cut-short their promising restoration work of Beijing's cultural heritage sites in 1937 and abandoned their now famous courtyard residence in Beijing to flee southward along with personnel and materials of the Architectural Department of Northeastern University; their  exodus lea them and their children to temporary settlements in the cities of Tianjin, Kunming, and finally Lizhuang in 1940. It was in Lizhuang where the bedridden Lin, still suffering from tuberculosis, was told of her younger brother's martyrdom while serving as a combat aviator in the air force in the defense of Sichuan. Lin wrote a poetic memorial:

After 1949, Lin Huiyin became a professor of architecture at Tsinghua University. As a literary writer and architectural historian, Lin Huiyin rebuilt the capital from the aspects of cultural tradition, architectural beauty, historical significance, and living conditions of the people. Meanwhile, Lin Huiyin participated in the design of the National emblem and the Monument to the People's Heroes.  Lin designed the floral wreath patterns at the base of the Monument to the People's Heroes. Lin also took part in the standardization of Beijing city planning.

She died in 1955 of tuberculosis.

Publications
Lin Huiyin wrote poems, essays, short stories and plays. Many of her works were praised for their subtlety, beauty, and creativity. Some of her more well known works are: Smile, Ninety-nine Degrees, Don't Let Our Land be Lost Again! and Meizhen and Them. Lin along with her husband wrote a book titled A Pictorial History of Chinese Architecture. During this pursuit, Lin along with her husband went to thousands of ancient Chinese architectural sites. She conducted research and preserve China's architectural history. They lobbied hard to protect many of the old buildings in Beijing at a time when many parts of the city were being leveled by the municipal government. She also translated English works into Chinese.

Literature 
Lin Huiyin is well known for her many poems and essays, she was also one of the outstanding female representatives of the May Fourth Movement. Her essays are full of delicate feelings and are combined with the musical sense in the Chinese poetic tradition. Her novels are full of modern content, such as the most famous "You Are the April of This World". Similarly, Lin Huiyin and other writers also participated in the May Fourth Movement. Unfortunately, "gender" has a great irony for the national cultural revival of the May Fourth Movement. Under the hegemony of antitraditionalism, it made the environment for female writers tougher. Nevertheless, Lin Huiyin skillfully integrated the aesthetics of Tang poetry into the language and syntax of modernism and used the traditional literary practice of episodic narration to combat the gender determinants of these idioms. Lin Huiyin was fond of free love and ideal, but the free love under May Fourth turned into the tragic idealism in the social background, which exacerbated the pain of gender oppression. 

In addition to architectural research, Lin Huiyin also engaged in literary creation. As a young girl, Lin Huiyin went abroad with her father to study in Europe. In England, Lin met Xu Zhimo in England, who guided her to the road of literature. Therefore, Lin Huiyin set her foot on the road of literature. Xu Zhimo encouraged Lin Huiyin to write literature, especially poetry. Later, they organized activities, performed dramas, and experimented with more literary forms together. When Rabindranath Tagore came to China, Lin and Xu worked together as translators, contacting the great poets of the world and learning poems from Tagore. She was more famous because she became the leading lady in Tagore's drama Chitra.

Lin Huiyin has a strong understanding of literature, therefore, her poems are rich in themes. During the transient years, in the quiet contemplation at night, Lin Huiyin has been used to expressing her feelings in poetry. Her poems often reveal the subtlety of human love, the silent beauty of nature, and the fortitude of life.

Legacy 

In October, 2010, as part of a revival of Lin Huiyin and her husband's life accomplishments, CCTV broadcast a six-hour, eight-episode documentary on the husband and wife. The documentary is titled Liang Sicheng Lin Huiyin and was directed by Hu Jingcao. Although Lin did not receive the recognition during her lifetime considering her gender, there is now a renewed revival of her legacy. It has been quoted of Lin Huiyin that "it is often only through the light given off by a man that we see the woman behind him, particularly so for young women in the arts who emerged from the republican era. But Lin Huiyin is an exception. In her, we see the reflection of many outstanding men of the time, but in fact it is she who adds extra color and shine to their images."

In 2018, the New York Times wrote a belated obituary for Lin Huiyin and her husband.

Notes

Further reading 

Fairbank, Wilma. Liang and Lin: Partners in Exploring China's Architectural Past. University of Pennsylvania Press. 1994. 
 Ch 9, “Chinese Friends,” John King Fairbank. Chinabound: A Fifty-Year Memoir. New York: Harper & Row,  1982.   ), pp. 104–113.
 Sicheng Liang, translated by Wilma Fairbank. A Pictorial History of Chinese Architecture: A Study of the Development of Its Structural System and the Evolution of Its Types. (Cambridge, MA: MIT Press,  1984).  Reprinted: Dover: 2005.
Wong, Sidney (黄振翔). "Lin Huiyin (林徽因) and Liang Sicheng (梁思成) as Architectural Students at the University of Pennsylvania (1924-27)" Planning and Development Volume 23, No. 1, page 75–93, 2008.
MCLC Resource Center. “Liang Sicheng, Lin Huiyin, Part 2,” July 5, 2017. https://u.osu.edu/mclc/2017/07/05/liang-sicheng-lin-huiyin-part-2/.
“Lin Huiyin.” Accessed October 24, 2021. http://www.cdsndu.org/html_en/to_specialArticleContent_specialArticleID=8a28e6d84aed8358014af1977217030a.html.
Zhu Tao. “To Search High and Low: Liang Sicheng, Lin H­uiyin, and China’s Architectural ­Historiography, 1932–1946 by Zhu Tao,” n.d., 1.

1904 births
1955 deaths
20th-century women writers
20th-century poets
20th-century Chinese architects
20th-century Chinese women artists
20th-century Chinese artists
Chinese women architects
Chinese women poets
Chinese architectural historians
Republic of China poets
People's Republic of China poets
Boxer Indemnity Scholarship recipients
University of Pennsylvania School of Design alumni
Yale University alumni
Yale School of Drama alumni
Academic staff of the National Southwestern Associated University
Writers from Hangzhou
Artists from Hangzhou
Poets from Zhejiang
Chinese women historians
20th-century deaths from tuberculosis
Tuberculosis deaths in China
Burials at Babaoshan Revolutionary Cemetery